Andrea Cagnetti (born 16 March 1967 in Corchiano, Viterbo), known in the artistic world as Akelo, is an Italian goldsmith, designer, and sculptor. He is known for his research of the ancient techniques used in metalworking.

Biography

After having obtained a diploma at the Ronciglione state secondary school, with a concentration in scientific studies, Akelo transferred to Rome, where for several years he worked as a graphic artist while continuing to pursue his in-depth studies of texts and documents relating to ancient goldsmithing, metallurgy, and alchemy.

Combining this theoretical understanding with extensive experimentation on materials and techniques, he creates gold objects and makes sculptural objects out of gold, bronze, and iron, using the artistic name of Akelo (from Achelous, Greek god of the waters).

In 2010 the artist created the bronze sculpture "Hope" for the Robert Bresson Prize, given every year at the Venice Film Festival.

Andrea Cagnetti lives in Corchiano, where he also writes scientific articles on the techniques used in goldsmithing.

Works in public collections

 HOEDUS II (1996) Pendant – Newark Museum
 YILDUN (2001) Pendant – Museum of Art and Archaeology, University of Missouri
 CHORT (2002) Pendant – Museum of Fine Arts, Boston 
 DENHEB (2004) Necklace – Museum of Art and Archaeology, University of Missouri
 SEGIN (2009) Pyx – Museum of Fine Arts, Boston 
 STRANGE MECHANISM No. 3 (2010) Sculpture – Museum of Art and Archaeology, University of Missouri

Bibliography

 "Akelo: Golden Works 1994–2000" – G. Spinola/P. d’Ambrosio – Saatchi & Saatchi/Lupetti Editore (2004) 
 "Etruschi, scoperto il segreto dei loro gioielli" – Corriere della sera (2000) – 
 "I segreti degli ori Etruschi" Youtube.com "I segreti degli ori Etruschi" (italian) – (2000) "Ulisse, Il piacere della scoperta – Sulle tracce degli Etruschi" di Piero ed Alberto Angela (RAI 3)
 "Der Schmuck der Etrusker"  Youtube.com "Der Schmuck der Etrusker" (german) – (2003) Abenteuer Erde" (HR – Hessischer Rundfunk) 
 "Experimental survey on fluid brazing in ancient goldsmith's art" – International Journal of Material Research (2009)  
 "The Voyage of a Contemporary Italian Goldsmith in the Classical World: Golden Treasures of Akelo” – Mary Pixley – Museum of Art and Archaeology, University of Missouri (2010)  
 "Gioiello Italiano Contemporaneo" – Skyra – Rizzoli International (2007)
 "Akelo's Treasures – An Exhibition Celebrating 25 Years of a Roman Master Goldsmith" – Bentley & Skinner, London (2011)
 "Materia Nova" –  Galerie Ludwig Trossaert, Contemporary art (2012)   – D/2012/12.184/07 
 "Metodo sperimentale per la realizzazione di un paio di orecchini finemente decorati con granulazione al pulviscolo e filigrana" – Il Covile (Italy, 2013)

Main Exhibitions

 "Materia Nova" – Galerie Ludwig Trossaert, Contemporary art – Antwerp, Belgium (18 May – 6 June 2012)
 "Collecting for a New Century: Recent Acquisition" – Museum of Art And Archaeology, University of Missouri – Columbia, MO – U.S.A (28 January – 13 May 2012)
 "Akelo's Treasures. An Exhibition Celebrating Twenty-Five Years of a Roman Master Goldsmith" – Bentley & Skinner (Bond Street Jewellers) Ltd – London – U.K. (November 2011)
 ”Golden Treasures by Akelo” – Museum of the Gemological Institute of America – Carlsbad, California, U.S.A. (October 2010 – March 2011)
 "The Voyage of a Contemporary Italian Goldsmith in the Classical World: Golden Treasures by Akelo" – Museum of Art And Archaeology, University of Missouri – Columbia, MO – U.S.A  (5 June – 26 September 2010)
 "Gioiello Italiano Contemporaneo" – Castello Sforzesco, Milano / Palazzo Valmarana Braga, Vicenza / Kunstgewerbemuseum, Berlin / Museo di arti decorative Pietro Accorsi, Torino (January 2008 – January 2009)
 "In Its Time: Materials and Techniques Throughout Jewelry History" – Aaron Faber Gallery – New York CityA. (2009)
 "Akelo: risplende l'oro degli Etruschi" – Vicenzaoro2, Fiera di Vicenza  – Vicenza, Italy (June 2005)
 "The Hanover World Exposition 2000" – Italian Pavillon – Hanover, Germany (June – October 2000)

References

 "Una scultura di Akelo nel museo dell'Università del Missouri" ADNKronos (Italy) – April 2012
 "A Sculpture by the Italian Artist Akelo in the Permanent Collection of the Museum of Art and Archaeology of the University of Missouri" Artwallzine – (U.K.) April 2012
 "Museum exhibit highlights the splendor of collecting" – The Columbia Daily Tribune (U.S.A) – March 2012 
 "Timeless Gold" – Vogue (Italy) – October 2011
 "Great Designers" – World Gold Council – 2011 
 "The Midas Touch" – The Mayfair Magazine (U.K.) – November 2011
 "Granulation Rediscovered" – Antiques Trade Gazette (U.K.) – November 2011
 "Una Mostra per i 25 anni di Akelo" – 18 Karati (Italy) – November 2011
 "Bentley and Skinner hosts Akelo show" – The Jeweller Magazine (U.K.) – October 2011
 "Bentley & Skinner to host Akelo retrospective" – Professional Jeweller (U.K.) – October 2011
 "Akelo festeggia i 25 anni di attività da Bentley & Skinner" – Preziosa Magazine (Italy) – October 2011 
 "Un etrusco a London" – Vioromagazine (Italy) – October 2011 
 "Bentley & Skinner to host celebration of Akelo's 25 years" – Jewellery World Review (Thailand) – September 2011
 "Творческий юбилей Akelo – в Лондоне" – Jewellernet (Russia) – September 2011 
 "Bentley & Skinner to exhibit works of Andrea Cagnetti" – Diamond World (China) – September 2011 
 "Breathing new life into an age old technique" – The Malta Independent (Malta) – September 2011 
 "A Pendant by the Italian Artist Akelo in the Permanent Collection of the Newark Museum" – The Benchpeg (U.K.) – April 2011
 "Les bijoux étrusques d'Akelo" – Guide Bijoux (France) – April 2011 
 "Italian Artist's Pendant acquired by Newark Museum" – JewelleryNetAsia (China) – March 2011 
 "Modern Artist Brings Ancient Techniques to Life" – GIA Insider (U.S.A.) – December 2010 
 "Masterpieces by Akelo" – Solitaire International (India) – October 2010
 "Echi etruschi di Akelo" – 18 Karati (Italy) – August 2010
 "Museums acquire two Akelo Pieces" –  International Jewellery Couture. Europa Star  – September 2010 
 "Golden Treasures by Akelo" 
 "Golden Treasures Exhibit" – Rock&Gem (U.S.A.) – June 2010
 "An artist's golden touch" – The Columbia Daily Tribune (U.S.A) – May 2010 
 "Exhibition to feature gold jewellery inspired by ancient Etruscans" – Gold Bulletin (U.S.A.)  – April 2010
 "Etruscan-inspired gold exhibit sets sail for U.S." – National Jeweler (U.S.A.) – April 2010
 "Golden Treasures by Akelo" – Museum Magazine – MAA University of Missouri (U.S.A.) – January 2010
 "L’alchimista-orafo che fa rivivere i gioielli etruschi" – Di Tutto (Italy)  – December 2009
 "Museu de Belas Artes de Boston (EAU) recebe peça do Joalheiro Andrea Cagnetti" – Infojoia (Brazil)  – January 2009
 "Museum of Fine Arts Receives Gift of Cagnetti Pendant" – Art Knowledge News – April 2008 
 "A touch of gold: Andrea Cagnetti explores the Etruscan enigma – Golden secret of Etruscan" – Dollhouse Miniatures (U.S.A./U.K.) – March/April 2008
 "Andrea Cagnetti. Moderno alchimista" – Allure (Italy) – March 2008
 "Akelo: Contemporary Master in Ancient Goldsmithing Techniques" – Adornment, The Magazine of Jewelry and Relates Arts (U.S.A.)  – Winter, 2007
 "Gild trip" – Solitaire (Singapore)  – August/September 2006
 "Joias primordiais" – Joia & Cia (Brasil)  – July 2006
 "Andrea Cagnetti fait reviver l’or des Etrusques" – Heure (Switzerland)  – June/July 2006
 "Akelo: Master of granulation" – Jewellery World Review Magazine (Thailand)  – June 2006
 "Granulieren – Altes Verfahren wiederentdeckt, Etruskische Kunstfertigkeit erlebt Renaissance durch Akelo" – GZ Goldschmiede Zeitung (Germany) – January 2006
 "A Journey in the Historical Discoveries" – Al-Jawhara Magazine (Kuwait) – August 2005
 "The fruit of ancient goldsmith art" – World of Gold, Jewelry and Watches (Thailand) – Summer, 2005
 "L’etrusco ritrovato" – Vioro, Vicenzaoro International Magazine (Italy) – June 2005
 "Etruskiska guldsmeders hemlighet avslöjad" – Illustrerad Vetenskap (Denmark) – June 2001
 "Granulation: the perfection of the Etruscans" – Gold Magazine Europe (Italy)  – January 2001
 "Secret of Etruscan Jewels Uncovered" – Discovery (U.S.A)  – December 2000
 "Megfejtették az etruszk aranymuvesség titkàt" – Elet et Tudomany (Hungary) – December 2000
 "Ho rubato agli Etruschi la formula segreta dell’oro" – Oggi (Italy)  –  November 2000
 "Svelato il segreto dei gioielli etruschi" – Corriere di Viterbo (Italy) – October 2000
 "Culture: The Etruscans – After 25 centuries their gold mystery technique is discovered"  – AdnKronos (Italy) – October 2000
 "Etruschi, scoperto il segreto dei loro gioielli" – Corriere della sera (2000)

Television appearances 

  "Sulle tracce degli Etruschi" – Ulisse, il piacere della scoperta – RAI 3 (Italy)
  "I tesori del Vaticano" – Ulisse, il piacere della scoperta – RAI 3 (Italy)
  "Le meraviglie del British Museum" – Ulisse, il piacere della scoperta – RAI 3 (Italy)
  "Der Schmuck der Etrusker" – Abenteuer Erde  – HR Hessischer Rundfunk (Germany)
  "Unomattina" – RAI 1 (Italy)
  "Taccuino Italiano" – RAI International (Italy)
  "Destinos" – CNN en espanol
  "Mediterraneo" – RAI 2 (Italy) – FRANCE 3 (France) – CANAL ALGERIE (Algeria) – ERT/ET 1 (Greece)
  "Style" – MBC (Middle East)

External links
Official website

1967 births
Italian jewellers
Italian sculptors
Italian male sculptors
Living people
Italian designers